Westin Casuarina may refer to:
 Westin Grand Cayman, hotel formerly known as Westin Casuarina
 Westin Las Vegas, hotel formerly known as Westin Casuarina